WHUG (101.9 FM) is a radio station broadcasting a country music format. Licensed to Jamestown, New York, United States, the station is currently owned by Media One Radio Group.

Local disc jockeys heard on this station include Dan Warren (The My Country Morning Show; 6-10 am Monday - Friday) Matt Warren (Middays with Matt Warren;- 12-3 pm Monday - Friday) and Chris Sprague (3-7 pm Monday - Friday). Syndicated/national programming on WHUG includes The Lia Show, ZMax Racing Country, Rise Up Country, NASCAR USA and Country Countdown USA.

History
The station went on the air in 1965 at the 101.7 frequency as WXYJ-FM under the ownership of Bud Paxson; it signed on at roughly the same time as what was then its sister station, WNYP-TV. It later changed to WHUG, "Huggin' Country", and ultimately moved to 101.9 MHz; this was part of an agreement between WHUG and WXOX in Attica so that both could increase their power. It has long been Jamestown's country music outlet. The station changed call signs to WMHU, "102 Moo", in January 2001. The station changed its call sign back to the current WHUG in 2004.

From 1994 until his death in 2012, Bruce Baker, another local personality, hosted his long-running three-hour classic country program on the station on Saturday mornings. The classic country block remains on the station in the time slot with other hosts.

References

External links
WHUG official Web site

 FCC History Cards For WHUG (FM) (1965-1980)

Jamestown, New York
HUG